This is a list of schools in Wan Chai District, Hong Kong.

Secondary schools

 Government
  (何東中學)
 Queen's College 
 Tang Shiu Kin Victoria Government Secondary School

 Aided
 Buddhist Wong Fung Ling College
 Concordia Lutheran School - North Point (北角協同中學)
 Hong Kong Tang King Po College (香港鄧鏡波書院)
 Marymount Secondary School
 Rosaryhill Secondary School (玫瑰崗中學)
 SKH Tang Shiu Kin Secondary School
 St Francis' Canossian College 
 St Paul's Secondary School
 True Light Middle School of Hong Kong 
 TWGH Lee Ching Dea Memorial College (東華三院李潤田紀念中學)
 Wah Yan College, Hong Kong

 Direct Subsidy Scheme
 CCC Kung Lee College (中華基督教會公理高中書院)
 Confucius Hall Secondary School (孔聖堂中學)
 St Paul's Convent School (聖保祿學校)

 Private
 French International School of Hong Kong
 Hong Kong Japanese School (no upper secondary)

Primary schools

 Government
 Hennessy Road Government Primary School (軒尼詩道官立小學)
 Hennessy Road Government Primary School (Causeway Bay) (軒尼詩道官立小學（銅鑼灣）)
 North Point Government Primary School (Cloud View Road) (北角官立小學（雲景道）)
 Sir Ellis Kadoorie (Sookunpo) Primary School 

 Aided
 Buffhist Wong Cheuk Um Primary School (佛教黃焯菴小學)
 Li Sing Tai Hang School (李陞大坑學校)
 Marymount Primary School (瑪利曼小學)
 Po Leung Kuk Gold and Silver Exchange Society Pershing Tsang School (保良局金銀業貿易場張凝文學校)
 Po Kok Primary School (寶覺小學)
 Precious Blood Primary School (寶血小學)
 SKH St James' Primary School (聖公會聖雅各小學)
 St Francis' Canossian School (嘉諾撒聖方濟各學校)
 St Joseph's Primary School (聖若瑟小學)
 St Paul's Primary Catholic School (聖保祿天主教小學)
 TWGH Li Chi Ho Primary School (東華三院李賜豪小學)

 English Schools Foundation
 Bradbury School (白普理小學)

 Private
 Chinese Academy (晉德學校)
 Hong Kong Japanese School
 French International School of Hong Kong
 HKCA Po Leung Kuk School (保良局建造商會學校)
  Primary Section (高主教書院小學部)
 Rosaryhill School (玫瑰崗學校)
 St Paul's Convent School (Primary Section) (聖保祿學校（小學部）)
 True Light Middle School of Hong Kong

Special schools
 Aided
  (匡智獅子會晨崗學校)
 Jockey Club Hong Chi School (賽馬會匡智學校)

Former schools
 Hong Kong Sam Yuk Secondary School
 Indonesian School

References

Lists of schools in Hong Kong
Wan Chai District